Lake Maxinkuckee is the second largest natural lake in the U.S. state of Indiana, covering . The Town of Culver, Indiana, in southwestern Marshall County is located on its northwestern edge. Lake Maxinkuckee has a maximum depth of 88 feet (27 m) and an average depth of 24 feet (7 m). Local residents and visitors do many things including ice fishing on the lake.

The first inhabitants of the lake area were Mound Builders, most likely the Potawatomi or Miami. Several mounds were built on the banks of the lake, the largest being "Pare Mound," thought to be used as a point of reference for the natives. The first white settlers arrived in 1836. Henry Harrison Culver, for whom the town is now named, founded the Culver Military Academy in 1894.

The word Maxinkuckee is derived from the Potawatomi word Mog-sin-ke-ki, which means "big stone country".

References

External links
Historical Lake Maxinkuckee information and genealogical records
- Information on Lake Maxinkuckee
"Fates Worse Than Death" by  Kurt Vonnegut - he writes about Lake Maxinkuckee

Maxinkuckee
Native American history of Indiana
Mounds in Indiana
Potawatomi
Lakes of Marshall County, Indiana